

Anton Grasser (3 November 1891 – 3 November 1976) was a German general during World War II who commanded several corps. He was a recipient of the Knight's Cross of the Iron Cross with Oak Leaves. Grasser joined the Bundesgrenzschutz (Federal Border Guards) in 1951, retiring in 1953.

In the 1950s, Grasser was involved in organizing an illegal underground army set up by Wehrmacht and Waffen-SS veterans in the event of a Soviet invasion of West Germany. Grasser's role, as inspector general of the police and border police, was to provide this secret army with weapons from the police force in case of war. Grasser was connected to it through Albert Schnez, its leader, who had been Grasser's employer in the first post-war years.

Awards and decorations
 Iron Cross (1914) 2nd Class (18 June 1915) & 1st Class (6 June 1916)
 Clasp to the Iron Cross (1939) 2nd Class (21 May 1940) & 1st Class (8 June 1940)
 German Cross in Gold on 11 March 1943 as Generalleutnant and commander of 25. Infanterie-Division
 Knight's Cross of the Iron Cross with Oak Leaves
 Knight's Cross on 16 June 1940 as Oberstleutnant and commander of Infanterie-Regiment 119
 Oak Leaves on 5 December 1943 as Generalleutnant and commander of 25. Panzergrenadier-Division
 Order of Merit of the Federal Republic of Germany (1953)

References

Citations

Bibliography

 
 
 
 

1891 births
1976 deaths
People from Bas-Rhin
German Army generals of World War II
Generals of Infantry (Wehrmacht)
German Army personnel of World War I
Recipients of the clasp to the Iron Cross, 1st class
Recipients of the Gold German Cross
Recipients of the Knight's Cross of the Iron Cross with Oak Leaves
German prisoners of war in World War II
Commanders Crosses of the Order of Merit of the Federal Republic of Germany
People from Alsace-Lorraine
German police chiefs